The 8:15 from Manchester is a British children's television series that aired on BBC1 on Saturday mornings from 21 April 1990 to 14 September 1991. The show took its name from the train departing from Manchester Piccadilly station for London Euston, which was, and still is at 08:15. It was presented by Ross King and Charlotte Hindle. BBC Radio 1 and subsequently BBC North West weather presenter Dianne Oxberry joined for the second series.

The format was very similar to Going Live!, with imported cartoons (Rude Dog and the Dweebs, The Jetsons and Defenders of the Earth) punctuating items, such as games, music performances and interviews. A regular segment was The Wetter The Better, a game show based in a swimming pool (filmed in Blackpool) and hosted by Ross King. A weekly drama was shown, in which the short episode ended in a dilemma of some sort (e.g. should x tell her sister that y has been cheating on her). Two endings had been filmed and viewers telephoned to vote which ending would be shown.

Transmissions

References

External links

Summer Replacements at Saturday Mornings
The 8:15 from Manchester on Paul Morris' SatKids

1990 British television series debuts
1991 British television series endings
1990s British children's television series
BBC children's television shows
English-language television shows
Television shows set in Manchester